Javier "El Tigre de Villarubia" Hernandez (born 2 November 1989 in Spain) is a Spanish lightweight kickboxer currently fighting out of Tiger Team.  He is a former I.S.K.A. inter-continental champion and former It's Showtime 61MAX champion.

As of November 2012, Hernandez is ranked the #7 lightweight in the world by LiverKick.com.

Career/Biography

Growing up fighting on the Spanish scene Javier had a decent amateur record winning the national title in 2008 and winning a bronze and silver medal in Full-Contact and K-1 rules at the W.P.K.A. world championships, held at the end of the year.  He also had a number of professional fights that year, culminating by winning the Iberian pro belt.  In 2009 Javier won his first professional international title by becoming the I.S.K.A. inter-continental champion.

These victories still left Javier virtually unheard of outside of Spain and this was echoed when he was announced as the challenger to  61MAX world champion Karim Bennoui  for the first ever It's Showtime event to be held in Spain in June, 2011.  Bennoui had looked great in beating the previous champion Sergio Wielzen a few months' previously and many fancied him against the underdog Hernandez.  Javier proved everyone wrong in what was arguably the most exciting world title fight ever held by It's Showtime, surviving a second round knockdown to come back with a knockdown of his own to take a unanimous decision victory after five rounds and become the new champion.

He lost to Yuki by KO due to lowkicks in round two at RISE 90 in Tokyo, Japan on October 25, 2012.

He beat Mickael Peynaud by decision at Heroes IV in Cordoba, Spain on November 17, 2012.

Titles

Professional
2017 Wu Lin Feng world Champion -60 
2011-It's Showtime 61MAX world champion -61 kg 
2009 I.S.K.A. inter-continental champion -64.5 kg (K-1 Rules)
2009 F.E.K. Spanish champion (K-1 Rules)
2008 F.E.K. Iberian champion (K-1 Rules)

Amateur
2008 W.P.K.A. World Championships in Limassol, Cyprus  (K-1 Rules)
2008 W.P.K.A. World Championships in Limassol, Cyprus  (Full-Contact)
2008 F.E.K. Spanish national champion (K-1 Rules)

Kickboxing record 

|-
|- bgcolor="#FFBBBB"
| 2018-03-10 || Loss ||align=left| Zhao Chongyang  || Wu Lin Feng 2018: -60kg World Championship Tournament, Semi Finals || Jiaozuo, China || TKO (Forfeit) || 1 ||
|-
|- bgcolor="#CCFFCC"
| 2018-03-10 || Win ||align=left| Wang Junyu  || Wu Lin Feng 2018: -60kg World Championship Tournament, Quarter Finals || Jiaozuo, China ||  Ext.R Decision (Unanimous) || 4 || 3:00
|-
|- bgcolor="#CCFFCC"
| 2017-05-06 || Win ||align=left| Hirotaka Asahisa  || Wu Lin Feng 60 kg World Tournament  Final  || China || Ext.R Decision (Unanimous) || 4 || 3:00
|-
! style=background:white colspan=9 |
|-
|- bgcolor="#CCFFCC"
| 2017-05-06 || Win ||align=left| Wang Junyu  || Wu Lin Feng 60 kg World Tournament  Semifinal  || China || Decision (Unanimous) || 3 || 3:00
|-
|- bgcolor="#CCFFCC"
| 2017-04-01 || Win ||align=left| Kunbut  || Wu Lin Feng 60 kg World Tournament Group D Final || China || KO  || 3 ||
|-
|- bgcolor="#CCFFCC"
| 2017-04-01 || Win ||align=left| Feng Liang  || Wu Lin Feng 60 kg World Tournament Group D Semifinal 1 || China || Decision (Unanimous) || 3 || 3:00
|- bgcolor="#FFBBBB"
| 2016-09-19 || Loss ||align=left| Taiga  || K-1 World GP 2016 -60kg World Tournament, quarterfinals || Tokyo, Japan || TKO (retirement) || 2 || 3:00
|-
|- bgcolor="#CCFFCC"
| 2016-04-19 || Win ||align=left| Calogero Palmeri  ||  ||  || KO (low kick) || 2 || 0:34
|-
|- bgcolor="#FFBBBB"
| 2015-11-14 || Loss ||align=left| Karim Bennoui || La 22ème Nuit Des Champions || Francia || Decision (unanimous) || 5 || 3:00
|-
|-  bgcolor="#CCFFCC"
| 2015-09-12 || Win||align=left| Michael Thompson || The Circle 1  || Barcelona, Spain || Decision (unanimous) || 3 || 3:00
|-
|- bgcolor="#FFBBBB"
| 2015-07-04 || Loss ||align=left| Deng Zeqi || Wu Lin Feng || China || Decision (unanimous) || 3 || 3:00
|-
|-  bgcolor="#FFBBBB"
| 2015-04-19 || Loss ||align=left| Koya Urabe || K-1 World GP 2015 -55kg Championship Tournament || Tokyo, Japan || Decision (unanimous) || 3 || 3:00
|-
|-  bgcolor="#FFBBBB"
| 2015-01-18 || Loss ||align=left| Hirotaka Urabe || K-1 World GP 2015 -60kg Championship Tournament, semifinals || Tokyo, Japan || Extra round decision || 4 || 3:00
|-
|-  bgcolor="#CCFFCC"
| 2015-01-18 || Win ||align=left| Kotaro Shimano || K-1 World GP 2015 -60kg Championship Tournament, quarterfinals || Tokyo, Japan || Decision || 3 || 3:00
|-
|-  bgcolor="#CCFFCC"
| 2014-11-22 || Win ||align=left| Thomas Adamandopoulos || La 21ème Nuit des Champions  || Marseille, France ||TKO  || 5 ||  3:00
|-
|-  bgcolor="#CCFFCC"
| 2014-10-05 || Win ||align=left| German Tabuenca || Armados y Peligrosos VIII || Barcelona, Spain || Decision || 3 || 3:00
|- 
|-  bgcolor="#CCFFCC"
| 2014-09-08 || Win ||align=left| Bruno Almeida || Todos con Rafa Fuentes || Cordoba, Spain || Decision || 3 || 3:00
|-
|-  bgcolor="#CCFFCC"
| 2014-03-15 || Win ||align=left| Rui Brucenio || Heroes Sevilla 3 || Sevilla, Spain || KO || 2 ||
|-
|-  bgcolor="#FFBBBB"
| 2013-28-09 || Loss ||align=left| Modibo Diarra || TK2 World Max|| Marsella, France || Decision || 3 || 3:00
|-
|-  bgcolor="#c5d2ea"
| 2013-03-16 || Draw ||align=left| Hamza Essalih || El Desafio k1|| Málaga, Spain || Decision || 3 || 3:00
|-
|-  bgcolor="#CCFFCC"
| 2012-11-17 || Win ||align=left| Mickael Peynaud || Heroes IV || Cordoba, Spain || Decision || 3 || 3:00
|-
|-  bgcolor="#FFBBBB"
| 2012-10-25 || Loss ||align=left| Yuki || RISE 90 || Tokyo, Japan || KO (low kick) || 2 || 2:03
|-
|-  bgcolor="#FFBBBB"
| 2012-07-21 || Loss ||align=left| Masahiro Yamamoto || It's Showtime 59 || Arona, Spain || Decision (unanimous) || 5 || 3:00
|-
! style=background:white colspan=9 |
|-
|-  bgcolor="#CCFFCC"
| 2012-05-13 || Win ||align=left| Carlos Chiquitín Reyes || El Desafio  || Santa Cruz de Tenerife, Spain || Decision || 3 || 3:00
|-
|-  bgcolor="#FFBBBB"
| 2012-04-07 || Loss ||align=left| Ruben Almeida || Ring of Glory || Mafra, Portugal || Decision (Majority) || 5 || 3:00
|-
! style=background:white colspan=9 |
|-
|-  bgcolor="#CCFFCC"
| 2011-11-19 || Win ||align=left| Ruben Almeida || Heroes III || Cordoba, Spain || Decision || 3 || 3:00
|-  bgcolor="#CCFFCC"
| 2011-06-18 || Win ||align=left| Karim Bennoui || It's Showtime 2011 Madrid || Madrid, Spain || Decision (Unanimous) || 5 || 3:00
|-
! style=background:white colspan=9 |
|-
|-  bgcolor="#FFBBBB"
| 2011-04-09 || Loss ||align=left| Carlos Chiquitín Reyes || Segunda Velada Peleas || Santa Cruz de Tenerife, Spain || Decision (Majority) || 5 || 2:00
|-
|-  bgcolor="#CCFFCC"
| 2011-03-13 || Win ||align=left| German Tabuenca || Armados y Peligrosos VI || Barcelona, Spain || Decision || 5 || 2:00
|-
|-  bgcolor="#CCFFCC"
| 2010-04-24 || Win ||align=left| Nuno Correia || K-1 Santaella || Córdoba, Spain || KO (Punches) || 3 || 
|-
|-  bgcolor="#CCFFCC"
| 2009-07-19 || Win ||align=left| Leon Brest || Battle of Estepona || Estepona, Spain || Decision (Unanimous) || 5 || 3:00 
|-
! style=background:white colspan=9 |
|-
|-  bgcolor="#FFBBBB"
| 2008-07-19 || Loss ||align=left| Andy Thrasher || I.S.K.A. Event || Santa Cruz de Tenerife, Spain || KO || 3 || 
|-
|-
| colspan=9 | Legend:

See also 
List of It's Showtime events
List of It's Showtime champions
List of male kickboxers

References

1989 births
Living people
Spanish male kickboxers
Lightweight kickboxers